The Nadeshiko League Cup (Japanese: なでしこリーグカップ) is a cup competition for women's football clubs in Japan. The competition began as the L.League Cup in 1996 and it was abolished after the 1999 edition. It reappeared on the occasion of the 2007 FIFA Women's World Cup, under the name Nadeshiko League Cup.

Results

See also
WE League
Empress's Cup
WE League Cup

References

External links
 Nadeshiko League Official site

 
Women's football in Japan
Association football clubs established in 1996
1996 establishments in Japan